Ochrus ornatus is a species of beetle in the family Cerambycidae. It was described by Fisher in 1935.

References 

Hesperophanini
Beetles described in 1935